Barbara Schett and Patty Schnyder were the defending champions and won in the final 6–3, 6–2 against Silvia Farina Elia and Francesca Schiavone.

Seeds
Champion seeds are indicated in bold text while text in italics indicates the round in which those seeds were eliminated.

 Émilie Loit /  Petra Mandula (first round)
 Magüi Serna /  María Vento-Kabchi (semifinals)
 Barbara Schett /  Patty Schnyder (champions)
 Eleni Daniilidou /  Daniela Hantuchová (first round)

Draw

External links
2004 Open Gaz de France Draw

Doubles
Open Gaz de France